Charles Henderson Yoakum (July 10, 1849 – January 1, 1909) was a U.S. Representative from Texas.

Biography
Born near Tehuacana, Lincoln (now Limestone) County, Texas, Yoakum attended Larissa College in Cherokee County and Cumberland College.  He studied law, was admitted to the bar in 1874 and commenced practice in Emory, Texas.  He served as prosecuting attorney for Rains County in 1876.  He moved to Hunt County in 1883 and continued the practice of law in Greenville.  He served as district attorney for the eighth judicial district 1886-1890.  He served as member of the Texas Senate 1892-1896.

Yoakum was elected as a Democrat to the Fifty-fourth Congress (March 4, 1895 – March 3, 1897).  He continued the practice of law in Greenville, Texas, until 1900, when he moved to Los Angeles, California.
He returned to Texas in 1904.  He died in Fort Worth, Texas, January 1, 1909.  He was interred in Myrtle Cemetery, Ennis, Texas.

Yoakum was a brother of railroad executive Benjamin Franklin Yoakum and faith healer and social reformer Finis E. Yoakum.

Sources

1849 births
1909 deaths
County district attorneys in Texas
People from Limestone County, Texas
Democratic Party Texas state senators
People from Rains County, Texas
Democratic Party members of the United States House of Representatives from Texas
19th-century American politicians